Silva is a 1944 Soviet musical film directed by Aleksandr Ivanovsky and starring Zoya Smirnova-Nemirovich and Sergei Martinson. It was part of a cycle of operetta films made in European cinema during the era.

Cast 
 Zoya Smirnova-Nemirovich as Silva Varescu 
 Niyaz Dautov as Edvin 
 Margarita Sakalis as Stassi 
 Sergey Martinson as Boni 
 Sergey Dybcho as Leopold Volyapyuk
 Nina Dintan as Julianna Volyapyuk
 Georgiy Kugushev as Ferry
 Vladimir Taskin as Rons Volyapyuk
 Aleksandra Korvet as the maid
 Aleksandr Matkovsky as assistant director  
 Glikeriya Bogdanova-Chesnokova as  Princess Weglersheim

Production
The film is an adaptation of the 1915 operetta Die Csárdásfürstin (also known as Silva after its title character) composed by Emmerich Kalman with a libretto by Leo Stein and Bela Jenbach. The first staging of the operetta took place in Russia in 1916 in St. Petersburg during the war with Germany, but patriotism required to change the title of operetta from Queen of Czardas to the neutral Silva in Russia. The Soviet movie Silva was made at the Sverdlovsk Film Studios in Yekaterinburg.

Popularity
The film proved a major success with Soviet audiences, who during the later stages of the Second World War sought escapist entertainment and largely rejected films with war themes. The money it earned per copy of the film issued exceeded even that of the most popular films of the year Guilty Without Fault.

References

Bibliography
 Egorova, Tatiana K. Soviet Film Music: An Historical Survey. Psychology Press, 1997.
 Spring, Derek / Taylor, Richard. Stalinism and Soviet Cinema. Routledge, 2013.

External links

1944 films
Soviet black-and-white films
1944 musical films
Operetta films
Films based on operettas
1940s Russian-language films
Films directed by Aleksandr Ivanovsky
Films set in Vienna
Films set in Hungary
Films set in the 1910s
Soviet musical films